Hyphomicrobium facile is a bacterium from the genus of Hyphomicrobium which was isolated from soil in New Hampshire in the United States.

References

External links
Type strain of Hyphomicrobium facile at BacDive -  the Bacterial Diversity Metadatabase

Hyphomicrobiales
Bacteria described in 1989